Luchinki is a rural locality (a village) in Kupriyanovskoye Rural Settlement, Gorokhovetsky District, Vladimir Oblast, Russia. The population was 247 as of 2010. There are 3 streets.

Geography 
Luchinki is located 8 km southeast of Gorokhovets (the district's administrative centre) by road. Kruglovo is the nearest rural locality.

References 

Rural localities in Gorokhovetsky District